For the World is the first Japan extended play by Korean hip hop group Big Bang. The EP contains eight English songs with hip hop, dance, and soul elements, co-composed and written by band member G-Dragon. For the World reached number 53 on the weekly Oricon Albums Chart, and as high as 13 on the daily chart.

Track listing

Charts

References

External links
Big Bang Official site
Big Bang Japan Official Site

2008 EPs
BigBang (South Korean band) EPs
YG Entertainment EPs
Albums produced by G-Dragon